DeCaro or Decaro may refer to:

People 
 Antonio Decaro (born 1970), Italian politician, current Mayor of Bari 
 Dante DeCaro (born 1981), former guitarist/songwriter of the Canadian band Hot Hot Heat
 Dru Decaro (Andrew Philip DeCaro, born 1983), American musician, singer/songwriter and producer
 Frank DeCaro (born 1962), American writer, performer and talk radio host
 John DeCaro (born 1982), American former professional ice hockey goaltender
 Matt DeCaro, American film and stage actor
 Pat DeCaro (artist) (born 1951), American artist

Other uses 
 5329 Decaro, a minor planet discovered by R. H. McNaught on December 21, 1989 at Siding Spring Observatory
 Hills-DeCaro House, a 1906 remodel building by Frank Lloyd Wright in his Prairie style, located at Oak Park, Chicago

See also 

DeCarlo
 De Caro (disambiguation)